Latin language was lingua franca in Europe for a long time.  Below is a list of Latin honorifics and their abbreviations found in various texts, not necessary Latin.

Certain honorifics may be prepended with the intensive prefix prae-, indicating very high degree, e.g., praepotens(very powerful), as well as used in superlative form, such as clarissimus, and even constructed by the combination of the two lexical devices, as in exellens (eminent, worthy) -> praexcellens -> praexellentissimum.

References

Lists of Latin phrases
Honorifics by language
Lists of abbreviations